Encyclopedia of Major Marketing Strategies (formerly Encyclopedia of Major Marketing Campaigns) is a multi-volume reference work that describes and analyzes major marketing campaigns, published by Gale.

Volumes:

 I (1999)
 II (2007)
 III (2013)
 IV (2019)

References 

American encyclopedias
Series of non-fiction books
1999 works
Marketing
Economics books
Specialized encyclopedias